Bryan Anderson may refer to:
 Bryan Anderson (American football) (born 1980), retired American football player drafted by the Chicago Bears of the National Football League
 Bryan Anderson (baseball) (born 1986), catcher in the Oakland Athletics organization
 Bryan Anderson (politician) (born 1942), politician in Edmonton, Alberta, Canada
 Bryan Anderson (author), American author, veteran of the Iraq war

See also
 Brian Anderson (disambiguation)